Beckermonds is a small hamlet in the Craven district of North Yorkshire, England. The hamlet lies at the western end of Langstrothdale, at the confluence of Green Field Beck and Oughtershaw Beck, which join to form the start of the River Wharfe.

The toponym, first recorded in 1241 as Beckermotes, is from the Old Norse bekkjar mót, meaning "the meeting of the streams".  The intrusive n was added later under the influence of Old French mont, "hill".

The hamlet consists of five dwellings. Population is six. Two of the cottages are run as holiday lets which, when fully occupied, add twelve to this figure.

References

External links

Beckermonds on Google Maps

Wharfedale
Hamlets in North Yorkshire